The Gotee Brothers was a Contemporary Christian music trio formed of the three founders of the Gotee Records label: Toby McKeehan (tobyMac), Joey Elwood, and Todd Collins. The trio only released one album in 1997, "ERACE", and its contents dealt with racial issues. The album won Hip Hop Album of the year at the 28th GMA Dove Awards.

Discography

Albums
ERACE (1997)

Awards

Doves
1997: Hip Hop Album of the Year (ERACE)

References

External links
Gotee Records

Gotee Records artists
American Christian musical groups